Belousov Point is an ice-covered headland forming the southern tip of the Anderson Peninsula, located just north of the terminus of Suvorov Glacier, situated in Victoria Land, Antarctica. The geographical headland was first mapped by the Soviet Antarctic Expedition of 1958 and named for the Soviet polar captain Mikhail P. Belousov, 1904–46. The headland lies on the Pennell Coast, a portion of Antarctica lying between Cape Williams and Cape Adare.

References
 

Headlands of Victoria Land
Pennell Coast